The 1918–19 Saint Francis Red Flash men's basketball team represented Saint Francis University during the 1918–19 NCAA men's basketball season. The team finished with a final record of 9–3.

Schedule

|-

References

Saint Francis Red Flash men's basketball seasons
Saint Francis
Saint Francis Red Flash
Saint Francis Red Flash